Old Eldon is a village in County Durham, in England. It is situated a short distance to the east of Bishop Auckland.

External links

Villages in County Durham